Celso Borges Mora (born 27 May 1988), is a Costa Rican professional footballer who plays as a central midfielder for Liga FPD club Alajuelense and the Costa Rica national team. With 158 international appearances, he is the most capped player in Costa Rica's history.

Early years
His father is Alexandre Guimarães, Brazilian-born, Costa Rican-raised ex-footballer and coach. He was born in Costa Rica's capital city San José and during his highschool years he attended Sistema Educativo Saint Clare Highschool, where he also took part in the school's team and was taught everything about soccer by Costa Rican football legend don Juan Varela. His studies were often interrupted by his football training and playing outside the country.

Club career

Saprissa
At the age of 18, Borges made his professional debut for Saprissa on 15 January 2006. He won five national championships with Saprissa.

Fredrikstad FK
On 18 January 2009, Fredrikstad FK sporting director Tor-Kristian Karlsen confirmed that Borges had signed for them, joining on 1 July when Borges's contract with Saprissa expired. Fredrikstad later agreed to pay 1 million kroner (125,000 €) to Deportivo Saprissa so Borges could join the team immediately and play for Fredrikstad, when the season started on 14 April, against the former league champion Stabæk. In March 2011, Borges stated he would leave Fredrikstad during or after the 2011 season.

AIK
On 1 January 2012, it was confirmed that Borges, as a free agent, was to leave Fredrikstad FK signing a three-year contract with the Swedish football club AIK Stockholm.

He received the vacant number 10 jersey, last worn by Martin Kayongo-Mutumba.

On 1 April 2012, Borges made his first match for AIK, in a match against Mjällby AIF. He got his first goal for the club in the next game, scoring the game-winning goal against Kalmar FF. During the first half of the season he was used as a striker by manager Andreas Alm. But after the summer vacation he dropped down and started playing as a central midfielder and subsequently was the team's first choice in central midfield. He finished the season ending up as the team's best goalscorer.

Deportivo La Coruña
On 14 January 2015, Borges joined Deportivo de La Coruña, signing with them until the end of the season, with an option of a two-year extension. He scored twice in his first official appearance for Dépor, having started in a 1–2 away win against Rayo Vallecano on 30 January which also marked his La Liga debut.

International career
Borges currently holds the appearance record for the Costa Rica national football team with 158 caps, scoring 27 goals. He has represented his country in over 50 FIFA World Cup qualification matches and at the 2014, 2018 and 2022 FIFA World Cup finals. He has also played at the 2011 and 2013 Copa Centroamericana, as well as at the 2009, 2011, 2013, 2015, 2019 and 2021 CONCACAF Gold Cups, and the Copa América Centenario.

Borges played in the 2005 FIFA U-17 World Championship held in Peru, in which he scored a goal and was considered among the best players of the tournament. After the tournament he was picked as one of ten players to watch out for in the future. Borges also participated in the 2007 FIFA U-20 World Cup held in Canada.

He made his debut for the Costa Rican senior team in a June 2008 FIFA World Cup qualification match against Grenada and, in September of the same year, scored his first international goal against Suriname.

After featuring prominently during the team's unsuccessful 2010 FIFA World Cup qualification campaign, Borges helped the team to a second-place finish at the 2011 Copa Centroamericana, as well as the quarter-finals of the CONCACAF Gold Cup later that year.

In June 2014, Borges was named in Costa Rica's squad for the 2014 FIFA World Cup. During the round of 16, Borges was the first of five Costa Rican players to successfully convert his kick in a 5–3 penalty shootout win over Greece.

In May 2018 he was named in Costa Rica's 23 man squad for the 2018 FIFA World Cup in Russia.

Personal life
Through his father, Borges was also a Brazilian national until 2017, when he relinquished his Brazilian nationality to become a Spanish citizen.

Borges is usually considered one of the most educated players of the Costa Rica national football team. El País' Diego Torres described him as "the brain of Costa Rica" and "a gleaned midfielder with elegant diction", while La Nación's Antonio Alfaro called him "the exemplary Costa Rican player." Aside from his native Spanish, Borges can also speak English, Portuguese and Swedish.

A heavy metal fan, citing Slipknot, Metallica, Dream Theater and Killswitch Engage as his favorite bands, Borges plays the drums, and has covered System of a Down's "Toxicity" alongside Peruvian musician Kurt Dyer.

Career statistics

Club

International

Scores and results list Costa Rica's goal tally first, score column indicates score after each Borges goal (includes unofficial goals scored).

Honours
Deportivo Saprissa
Primera División de Costa Rica: Apertura 2005, Clausura 2006, Apertura 2006, Clausura 2007, Apertura 2007, Clausura 2008, Apertura 2008

Costa Rica
Copa Centroamericana: 2013, 2014

Individual
CONCACAF Gold Cup All-Tournament Team: 2009
 CONCACAF Gold Cup Best XI: 2021

See also
 List of men's footballers with 100 or more international caps

References

External links

Profile  at Nacion.com 

1988 births
Living people
Costa Rican people of Brazilian descent
Footballers from San José, Costa Rica
Costa Rican footballers
Association football midfielders
Deportivo Saprissa players
Fredrikstad FK players
AIK Fotboll players
Deportivo de La Coruña players
Göztepe S.K. footballers
Liga FPD players
Eliteserien players
Norwegian First Division players
Allsvenskan players
La Liga players
Süper Lig players
Segunda División B players
Costa Rica under-20 international footballers
Costa Rica international footballers
2009 CONCACAF Gold Cup players
2011 Copa Centroamericana players
2011 CONCACAF Gold Cup players
2013 Copa Centroamericana players
2013 CONCACAF Gold Cup players
2014 FIFA World Cup players
2014 Copa Centroamericana players
2015 CONCACAF Gold Cup players
Copa América Centenario players
2018 FIFA World Cup players
2019 CONCACAF Gold Cup players
2021 CONCACAF Gold Cup players
2022 FIFA World Cup players
Copa Centroamericana-winning players
FIFA Century Club
Costa Rican expatriate footballers
Expatriate footballers in Norway
Expatriate footballers in Sweden
Expatriate footballers in Spain
Expatriate footballers in Turkey
Costa Rican expatriate sportspeople in Norway
Costa Rican expatriate sportspeople in Sweden
Costa Rican expatriate sportspeople in Spain
Costa Rican expatriate sportspeople in Turkey